Lepidosperma concavum, commonly known as the sandhill sword-sedge, is a plant found in coastal regions of south-eastern and eastern Australia.  It grows on sandy soils in woodland, forest and heathland.

Description
The sandhill sword-sedge is a tufted perennial with a short vertical rhizome and rigid, erect, sharp-edged culms.  It grows to 20–60 cm in height and 3–7 mm in width.  The inflorescence is erect, dense, ovate to oblong, 3–15 cm long and 2–4 cm in diameter, with a shorter involucral bract.  The numerous spikelets are 5–8 mm long, with 6 to 8 bracts, coverered in short fine hairs, red-brown to grey-brown. There are 6 scales at the base of stamen, whitish in colour. The smooth, pale to dark brown, ovoid nut is 2.7–4.0 mm long and 1.3–1.8 mm in diameter.  It flowers in spring and summer.

References

concavum
Flora of New South Wales
Flora of South Australia
Flora of Queensland
Flora of Victoria (Australia)
Flora of Tasmania
Poales of Australia
Plants described in 1804